Androrangavola is a rural municipality located in the Marolambo District, Atsinanana region of eastern Madagascar

References

Populated places in Atsinanana

it:Androrangavola